The  is a private American educational system PreK-12 boarding school in Hokkaido. It was founded in 1958.

Its main campus, HIS Sapporo, is in Toyohira-ku, Sapporo. The campus has approximately 180 to 190 students. The school was founded in 1958, and runs the International Primary Curriculum in the elementary school (Early Years to grade 5) the follow on International Middle Years Program in grades 6~8 and the American AP (Advanced Placement) program in the high school. The institution is accredited by the Western Association of Schools and Colleges.

The school has a branch elementary school campus in Niseko, Hokkaido, Hokkaido International School in Niseko (HIS Niseko), scheduled to open on January 23, 2012. The two campuses are the sole English-language international schools in Hokkaido.

Campus
Hokkaido International School main campus is located in the neighborhood of Sumikawa Station on the Namboku Line of the city's subway system. The campus consists of a co-educational dormitory, a soccer field, running track, basketball court, and a four-story main block. The first and second levels of the school contain school offices and elementary program classrooms, the third floor is dedicated to middle school and high school classrooms, the school's library and the computer lab. The fourth floor houses the gym.

Dormitory
Hokkaido International School's dormitory is located on campus. It is a co-educational dormitory, housing up to 40 students in total.

See also
 Americans in Japan

References

External links

 
 HIS Niseko

American international schools in Japan
Elementary schools in Japan
Schools in Hokkaido
High schools in Sapporo
1958 establishments in Japan
Educational institutions established in 1958
Boarding schools in Japan